John Scardina was a player in the National Football League for the Minnesota Vikings in 1987 as a tackle. He played at the collegiate level at Concordia University Wisconsin and Lincoln University.

Biography
Scardina was born on July 26, 1958 in Milwaukee, Wisconsin. He was inducted into the Minor League Football Hall of Fame in 2000.

References

1958 births
Minnesota Vikings players
Players of American football from Milwaukee
Concordia University Wisconsin alumni
Lincoln Blue Tigers football players
Living people
National Football League replacement players